The Moon in the Cloud is a light-hearted children's historical fantasy novel by Rosemary Harris, published by Faber in 1968. It is set in ancient Canaan and Egypt at the time of the Biblical Flood and rooted in the story of Noah's Ark. It is the first book of a series sometimes called the Egyptian trilogy, followed by The Shadow on the Sun (1970) and The Bright and Morning Star (1972).

Harris won the annual Carnegie Medal from the Library Association, recognising the year's best children's book by a British subject.

Macmillan published the first US edition in 1969.

The Moon in the Cloud was adapted for television in 1978.

Plot summary

When the Lord God decides to send a flood, he instructs Noah to build an Ark and save his family and the animals.  Noah gives his reprobate son Ham the responsibility of collecting two cats from Kemi, the Black Land (Egypt), and two lions, but Ham passes the task to his neighbour Reuben by promising to persuade Noah to let Reuben and his wife on the Ark.

Reuben travels to Kemi with his camel Anak, his cat Cefalu and his dog Benoni.  In the desert they are captured by the High Priest of Sekhmet, who is impressed by Cefalu's sacred heritage.  He houses the cat in the Temple of Sekhmet in Kemi's capital Men-nofer, where Cefalu falls in love with the resident temple cat Meluseth.  Reuben is presented as a slave to the music-loving King, who becomes his friend.  However, he despairs of returning home until a 'supernatural' display arranged by the High Priest of Ptah backfires.  Panic and rioting in the streets give Reuben a chance to escape and rescue his animals. Meluseth joins them.

On the way back, Cefalu persuades the lion Aryeh to come to the Ark.  They meet Thamar, who has camped in the desert to escape the attentions of Ham and has meanwhile rescued a lost lion cub.  They return home with the two cats and the two lions only to encounter treachery from Ham.  However, a providential accident secures them a place of safety just as the rain begins to fall.

Characters

The Lord God

The Canaanites
Reuben, a young animal-tamer, artist and musician, kind and brave
Thamar, his beautiful and devoted wife
Noah, a visionary patriarch
Noah's patient wife
Ham, Noah's wayward son, lazy, cruel, cowardly and deceitful
Japheth and Shem, Noah's dutiful sons, sceptical but obedient
Noah's daughters-in-law

The Egyptians
The High Priest of Sekhmet, ruthless and avaricious
Kenamut, the High Priest's shrewd interpreter
Ani, the High Priest's chief guard, & his family
The King, also known as Horus, the Son of Re, a good-hearted young man, beset by advisers
Senusmet, the King's Vizier, domineering and astute
Tahlevi, a kindly tomb robber
The High Priest of Ptah, ambitious and unscrupulous

The animals
Anak, Reuben's sarcastic dromedary, and his mate
Cefalu, Reuben's wilful black cat
Benoni, Reuben's amiable herd dog
Mouse, an elephant, and her mate
Meluseth, a beautiful white temple cat with delusions of grandeur
Aryeh, a formidable lion
A very young lion cub

History and legend

In the author's note, Rosemary Harris says the book is set in the Egyptian Old Kingdom, during the VIth Dynasty. At that time Upper and Lower Egypt had long been united with Men-nofer as the capital. The Flood is not fixed in historical time, and its being placed here tends to confirm the suspicion of some of the characters that it will be a merely local affair. The author cites several scholarly sources on Egypt and says that she has tried to avoid slips in the historical background, but "if there are some, I shall make the cowardly excuse that most writers on ancient Egypt blandly disagree on detail, right down to the spelling of names".

Literary significance and reception

A review in the Bulletin of the Center for Children's Books of March 1973 refers to the "sophisticated humor" of the novel, while another review of a later book by the author calls The Moon in the Cloud a "magical children's classic". John Rowe Townsend in a discussion of created worlds says the author "created an Ancient Egypt that (it seems safe to say) never was...  Talking animals are the least of the improbabilities." (However, it should be explained that the 'speech' of the animals is intended only as a representation of animal communication, which Reuben understands – these are not talking animals in the Narnian sense.) Townsend clearly appreciates the humour of the book and its sequels, referring particularly to the "delicate irreverence" with which the story of Noah's Ark is presented.

Awards

Beside winning the 1968 Carnegie Medal for British children's books,
The Moon in the Cloud was named a Horn Book Fanfare Best Book by the editors of the Horn Book Magazine in 1971.

Television adaptation

The novel was adapted for the children's television series Jackanory in 1978, with Ian McKellen as the reader.

See also

References

External links
 —immediately, first US edition 

1968 British novels
1968 children's books
British children's novels
Children's fantasy novels 
Carnegie Medal in Literature winning works
Novels based on the Bible
Novels about cats
Novels about dogs
Books about elephants
Books about lions
Novels about Noah's Ark
Novels set in ancient Egypt
Faber and Faber books